Bossiaea scolopendria, commonly known as plank plant, is a species of flowering plant in the family Fabaceae and is endemic to New South Wales. It is an erect, sparsely-branched shrub with flattened branches, ending in winged cladodes, the leaves mostly reduced to small scales except on the youngest branches, and yellow and red flowers.

Description

Taxonomy
Plank plant was first formally described in 1801 by Henry Cranke Andrews who gave it the name Platylobium scolopendrium in his book, The Botanist's Repository for New, and Rare Plants. In 1808, James Edward Smith changed the name to Bossiaea scolopendria in Transactions of the Linnean Society of London.

Distribution and habitat
Bossiaea scolopendria grows in heathland and forest on sandstone in near-coastal areas of central and southern New South Wales.

References

scolopendria
Mirbelioids
Flora of New South Wales
Plants described in 1808
Taxa named by Henry Cranke Andrews